Jungia schuerae is a plant species native to west-central Peru. It occurs on dry, rocky open slopes at elevations of 2200–4000 m, primarily in the regions of Lima and Ancash Regions but also in neighboring areas.

Jungia schueraeis a branching shrub up to 2.5 m tall. Leaves are without stipules; blades are round to heart-shaped in general outline, up to 10 cm long and 11 cm wide, with 5–7 palmate lobes. Flower heads are born in a dense paniculate array. Each head contains 17–25 pale yellow flowers.

References

schuerae
Flora of Peru